Kenneth Heiner-Møller (born Kenneth Heiner Christiansen; 17 January 1971) is a Danish football manager and former player. He is the former manager of the Canadian women's national team. In 1994–1995 he played for Ferencvárosi TC in Hungary, where fans know him as Kenneth Christiansen.

Background 
Aged 30, Heiner-Møller broke his leg and had to finish his career as a footballer.

He coached the Danish women's national team from 2006 until 2013, when he stood down to take over as chief executive of Team Danmark.

At the 2007 FIFA Women's World Cup, Heiner-Møller and Danish players accused the Chinese hosts of harassment and covert surveillance prior to China's first-round match against Denmark. China's Swedish coach Marika Domanski-Lyfors and her assistant Pia Sundhage were unaware of the incidents and Heiner-Møller absolved them of any blame, although he refused to shake hands after the match.

On 8 January 2018 he was named head coach of the Canada Women's National Team. On June 10, 2020, stepped down from that job to take a position in his native country as head of coach education for the Danish Football Association.

Persona life
Born Kenneth Heiner Christiansen, Heiner-Møller took his wife's maiden name Møller upon their marriage.

References

External links
Dansk Boldspil Union (DBU)

1971 births
Living people
Danish men's footballers
Ølstykke FC players
Ferencvárosi TC footballers
Vejle Boldklub players
Boldklubben af 1893 players
Aarhus Gymnastikforening players
Danish football managers
Danish expatriate football managers
2007 FIFA Women's World Cup managers
Denmark women's national football team managers
Canada women's national soccer team managers
Association football forwards
2019 FIFA Women's World Cup managers
Nemzeti Bajnokság I players
Expatriate footballers in Hungary
Danish expatriate men's footballers
Danish expatriate sportspeople in Hungary
People from Gentofte Municipality
Sportspeople from the Capital Region of Denmark